Michael Abene (born July 2, 1942) is an American jazz pianist known for accompanying singers and arranging music.

Early life and education
Abene was born in Brooklyn, New York. His father, grandfather, and aunt were musicians. He studied composition at the Manhattan School of Music.

Career 
Abene has accompanied Susannah McCorkle Julius La Rosa, and others. He had his first solo album Solo Piano in 1986. Abene co-produced the album Avant Gershwin, which won the Grammy Award for Best Jazz Vocal Album in 2007.

Discography

As leader
1986: You Must Have Been a Beautiful Baby (recorded December 1984)

As sideman
With Maynard Ferguson
Maynard '62 (Roulette, 1962)
Si! Si! M.F. (Roulette, 1962)
Maynard '63 (Roulette, 1962)
Message from Maynard (Roulette, 1962)
 Maynard '64 (Roulette 1959-62 [1963])
The New Sounds of Maynard Ferguson (Cameo, 1963)
Come Blow Your Horn (Cameo, 1963)
Color Him Wild (Mainstream, 1965)
The Blues Roar (Mainstream, 1965)
The Maynard Ferguson Sextet (Mainstream, 1965)
Ridin' High (Enterprise, 1967)
With Dizzy Gillespie
Cornucopia (Solid State, 1969)
With Urbie Green
The Fox (CTI, 1976)
With Cal Tjader
Solar Heat (Skye, 1968)

References

Jazz arrangers
1942 births
Living people
20th-century American pianists
American male pianists
21st-century American pianists
20th-century American male musicians
21st-century American male musicians
American male jazz musicians